The Integrated Train Testing Centre (ITTC) is a railway testing facility under construction in Tuas, Singapore. Constructed at the former site of the Raffles Country Club, opposite the Tuas Depot, the  ITTC will be used to test new rolling stock and rail systems for the Singapore MRT network. The ITTC is being modelled on other similar railway testing centres in Germany, South Korea and Japan. It will incorporate several green building features in its design and operation.

The ITTC was first announced on 24 April 2019, and construction began with a groundbreaking ceremony on 17 March 2021. The testing facility was expected to be completed in phases from 2022 to 2024; because of the COVID-19 pandemic in Singapore, the opening of the first phase was delayed to 2023. When fully operational in 2025, the ITTC will be the first such facility in Southeast Asia, featuring workshops, an operations control centre, an administration building and three types of tracks for safety tests.

History
The ITTC was first announced by then-transport minister Khaw Boon Wan on 24 April 2019. Hailing it as a "worthwhile investment" expected to cost a few hundred million dollars, Khaw said that the ITTC will allow "robust" testing of new railway systems without the need to close MRT lines. According to Khaw, such a facility would allow officials to develop deeper expertise in railway operations and maintenance.

Contract 190 for the design and construction of the ITTC was awarded to GS Engineering and Construction Corp (GS Engineering) on 17 April 2020 at a contract sum of S$639.5 million (US$ million). On 17 March 2021, construction of the ITTC began with a groundbreaking ceremony. The testing centre is to be constructed in two phases. The first phase, which includes the high-speed track, is planned to be completed by the end of 2022, allowing Circle line Stage 6 trains to be tested in 2023. The ITTC was originally expected to be completed by the end of 2024, with the construction of two additional test tracks and other facilities. However, with the COVID-19 pandemic in Singapore, the scheduled completion dates were pushed to 2023 and 2025, respectively.

On 1 November 2022, the rolling stock test and research facility for the ITTC has been 50% completed, with trackwork for the high-speed test track nearly completed. The other facilities, including the operations control centre and the administration building, are expected to be completed in 2023.

Description
The ITTC is being constructed on the former site of the Raffles Country Club in Tuas, which had originally been acquired for the now-cancelled Kuala Lumpur–Singapore high-speed rail. When completed, the ITTC will allow integrated systems testing for different trains and rail systems simultaneously, avoiding the need to conduct tests on operational lines. The testing facility, designed by the Korea Railroad Research Institute, will include an operations control centre, testing equipment and a rolling stock workshop. The ITTC will have  of track, which will be compatible with various types of signalling systems and will be powered by both 750V direct-current third rail and 25kV alternate current overhead catenary. The tracks will include:

A looped  endurance track with a 3% maximum gradient for performance testing.
A looped  S-curved performance and integration track for testing of train dynamics.
Stabling and maintenance tracks for any major refurbishment of existing trains.

Intended to achieve the Building and Construction Authority’s Green Mark Platinum certification, the ITTC will include energy-efficient features such as LED lights, solar panels and a centralised cooling system. The facility includes bicycle parking facilities and sheltered linkways between various buildings to promote walking and cycling within the facility.

External links
Site plan of the ITTC
Artist impressions of the ITTC

References

Railway test tracks
Mass Rapid Transit (Singapore)